The Vuelta a Boyacá is a road cycling race held annually since 1976 in the Boyacá Department of Colombia. Prior to 1996, the race was known as the Clásica de Boyacá.

Winners

Men

Repeat winners

Women

References

Cycle races in Colombia
Recurring sporting events established in 1976
Men's road bicycle races
1976 establishments in Colombia